Eremophila gibsonii is a flowering plant in the figwort family, Scrophulariaceae and is endemic to Australia. It is a sticky, glabrous, rounded shrub with narrow leaves and white to lilac-coloured flowers and which occurs in Western Australia, South Australia and the Northern Territory.

Description

The petal tube is white to pale lilac-coloured and covered on the outside with mostly glandular hairs. The inside surface of the petal lobes is glabrous but the inside of the tube is densely filled with long, soft hairs. The 4 stamens are fully enclosed in the petal tube.

Taxonomy and naming 
The species was first formally described in 1874 by Ferdinand von Mueller and the description was published in Fragmenta phytographiae Australiae. The specific epithet (gibsonii) honours Alfred Gibson who died on the Ernest Giles expedition in 1874 and after whom the Gibson Desert is named.

Distribution and habitat
In Western Australia, Eremophila gibsonii grows in the western part of the state in the Central Ranges, Great Victoria Desert and Murchison biogeographic regions. In South Australia it is found in the North-Western, Nullarbor and Gairdner-Torrens botanical regions. It also grows in the far south-western corner of the Northern Territory. It is a common shrub found on sand dunes in central Australia.

Conservation
Eremophila gibsonii is classified as "not threatened" by the Western Australian Government Department of Parks and Wildlife.

Use in horticulture
This eremophila has wispy foliage and delicate white to pale blue flowers. It can be propagated from cuttings but in this case needs to be grown in deep sand. The grafted form performs well in a range of soils but requires full sun. Mature specimens are drought and frost tolerant.

References

Flora of the Northern Territory
Flora of South Australia
Flora of Western Australia
gibsonii
Plants described in 1874
Taxa named by Ferdinand von Mueller